RPM was a Canadian magazine that published the best-performing singles of Canada from 1964 to 2000. Twenty singles peaked atop the RPM Singles Chart in 1982. "Physical" by Olivia Newton-John held the top position from 1981 into 1982, and Toni Basil achieved the final number-one hit of the year with "Mickey". Olivia Newton-John, Paul McCartney, Stevie Wonder, Steve Miller Band, Chicago, and Lionel Richie were the only acts that had previously topped the Canadian chart before this year. No artists peaked at number one more than once in 1982.

The sole Canadian act to peak at number one this year was rock band Rush. Joan Jett and the Blackhearts had the most successful single of the year with their cover of Arrows' "I Love Rock 'n Roll", which topped the listing for eight issues in March, April, and May. Survivor peaked at number one for six weeks with "Eye of the Tiger" while "Ebony and Ivory", a duet between Paul McCartney and Stevie Wonder, spent five weeks at the summit. Olivia Newton-John, The J. Geils Band, and Charlene remained at number one for four weeks with their respective singles, and Soft Cell and Men at Work both topped the listing for three weeks.

Chart history

Notes

See also
1982 in music

List of Billboard Hot 100 number ones of 1982 by Billboard
List of Cash Box Top 100 number-one singles of 1982 by Cashbox

References

External links
 Read about RPM Magazine at the AV Trust
 Search RPM charts here at Library and Archives Canada

RPM number-one singles
Canada Singles
1982